Adinopsis is a genus of beetles belonging to the family Staphylinidae.

The species of this genus are found in America.

Species

Species:

Adinopsis africana 
Adinopsis angusta 
Adinopsis australis

References

Staphylinidae
Staphylinidae genera